The Ligue de Football Professionnel (() Professional Football League), commonly known as the LFP, is an Algerian governing body that runs the major professional football league in Algeria. It was founded in 2010 and serves under the authority of the Algerian Football Federation. The president of the league is Abdelkrim Medouar.

The league is responsible for overseeing, organizing, and managing the top league in Algeria, Ligue 1 and the Algerian Super Cup.

See also 
 Ligue Nationale du Football Amateur

References

External links
 Official LFP site

Football governing bodies in Algeria
Algerian Ligue Professionnelle 1